Clallam Bay Corrections Center is situated on the Olympic Peninsula in Clallam County, two miles (3.2 km) south of the community of Clallam Bay, Washington.

CBCC opened as a medium-custody 450-bed facility in 1985 and converted to a Close Custody facility in 1991. In 1992, it expanded to house an additional 400 medium-custody inmates. Today, the facility can house 900 inmates.

The facility provides medium-, maximum-, and close-custody housing for inmates who are serving sentences for crimes committed in Washington State. Currently, 68.4% of Clallam Bay's offenders were convicted of violent offenses, with an average age of 32.1 years old.

There are 400 full-time professional correctional employees at Clallam Bay. Five correctional industries staff members manage the on-site garment industry. Thirty members of the staff and faculty from Peninsula College serve at the facility, providing adult offender education and staff training programs.

Notable inmates
George Russell - serial killer
Paul Kenneth Keller - serial arsonist
Barry Loukaitis - school shooter
Timothy Forrest Bass - Mandy Stavik killer
Kurtis Monschke - White supremacist murderer
Alex Baranyi - one of the Bellevue murderers
Nga Ngoeung - Spanaway murderer convicted in the 1994 murders of 17-year-olds Robert Forrest & Michael Welden

Dominick Sergio Maldonado - Tacoma Mall shooter was previously held at Clallam Bay Corrections Center but in 2016 was transferred to ADX Florence after an unsuccessful escape attempt.

See also
List of law enforcement agencies in Washington (state)
List of United States state correction agencies
List of U.S. state prisons
List of Washington state prisons

References 

Clallam Bay Corrections Center - Official Site
WA DOC Monthly Brochure

Confinement Statistics, as of May 31, 2008

Buildings and structures in Clallam County, Washington
Prisons in Washington (state)
1985 establishments in Washington (state)